Anthony Greco (born September 30, 1993) is an American professional ice hockey forward for Frölunda HC of the Swedish Hockey League (SHL).

Early life
Greco was born on September 30, 1993, in Queens, New York to parents Paul and Mary Jane. His mother is a retired nurse while his father served as a member of the New York City Fire Department and suffered  illnesses and conditions following his efforts during the September 11 attacks. While his father played baseball in college, Greco grew up a fan of the New York Rangers.

Playing career

Amateur
Undrafted to the NHL, Greco played college hockey with the Ohio State Buckeyes from 2012 to 2016 after playing junior with the Des Moines Buccaneers and Waterloo Blackhawks in the USHL. He then turned pro, playing in the American Hockey League for the Bridgeport Sound Tigers and Springfield Thunderbirds.

Professional
Greco was signed by the Florida Panthers of the National Hockey League to a two-year, two-way contact in November 2017. In the 2018–19 season, Greco was recalled from his assignment with the Springfield Thunderbirds to the Panthers on December 11, 2018 and made his NHL debut on December 13, in a 5–1 loss to the Minnesota Wild.

On July 15, 2019, Greco signed a one-year, two-way contract extension with the Panthers on July 15, 2019. In the following 2019–20 season, Greco continued with the Springfield Thunderbirds, collecting 19 points in 37 games. On February 20, 2020, Greco was traded by the Panthers to the Tampa Bay Lightning in exchange for Danick Martel Assigned to AHL affiliate, the Syracuse Crunch, Greco recorded 1 assist in just three games.

On February 24, 2020, Greco's brief stint in the Lightning organization ended when he was included in a trade along with a 2020 first-round pick to the San Jose Sharks in exchange for Barclay Goodrow and a third-round pick. He was immediately re-assigned to join the Sharks affiliate, the San Jose Barracuda. He posted 4 points in just 7 games with the Barracuda before the remainder of the season was cancelled due to the COVID-19 pandemic.

On October 9, 2020, having left the Sharks as a free agent he joined the New York Rangers on a two-year, two-way contract. Greco made his Rangers debut against the San Jose Sharks on January 13, 2022.

Having played the first seven seasons of his professional career in North America, on June 27, 2022, Greco opted to pursue a career abroad in agreeing to a one-year contract with Swedish top flight club, Frölunda HC of the SHL.

Career statistics

Awards and honors

References

External links
 

1993 births
Living people
American men's ice hockey right wingers
Bridgeport Sound Tigers players
Des Moines Buccaneers players
Florida Panthers players
Frölunda HC players
Hartford Wolf Pack players
Ohio State Buckeyes men's ice hockey players
New York Rangers players
San Jose Barracuda players
Springfield Thunderbirds players
Syracuse Crunch players
Undrafted National Hockey League players
Waterloo Black Hawks players